Selektsionny is a rural locality (a settlement) and the administrative center of Selektsionny Selsoviet Rural Settlement, Lgovsky District, Kursk Oblast, Russia. Population:

Geography 
The settlement is located 45 km from the Russia–Ukraine border, 72 km south-west of Kursk, 6.5 km south-west of the district center – the town Lgov.

 Climate
Selektsionny has a warm-summer humid continental climate (Dfb in the Köppen climate classification).

Transport 
Selektsionny is located on the road of regional importance  (Kursk – Lgov – Rylsk – border with Ukraine), on the road of intermunicipal significance  (38K-017 – Fitizh), 2.5 km from the nearest railway halt 387 km (railway line 322 km – Lgov I).

The rural locality is situated 78.5 km from Kursk Vostochny Airport, 147 km from Belgorod International Airport and 282 km from Voronezh Peter the Great Airport.

References

Notes

Sources

Rural localities in Lgovsky District